Kamen Georgiev is a Bulgarian MMA fighter who competes in the Light heavyweight division. World MMA title holder under ISFA rules 2016. MMA ASF PRO (Light-heavyweight champion 2020-),  He is a coach of the national Combat wrestling team (until 18 May 2022), and an international referee with a FICW license "A" class in combat wrestling. Also Kamen Georgiev has won World championships and accolades in multiple sports, most notably in MMA ISFA PRO (Light-heavyweight champion 2016-), World Combat Wrestling Championship (Champion under 100 kg, 2015, 2016), European Combat Wrestling Championship(Champion under 100 kg, 2018), World Sanda Championship (Heavyweight Champion 2009, 2011) and FIAS World Combat Sambo Cup(Champion under 90 kg, 2014).

Titles
 MMA ASF PRO (Light-heavyweight champion 2020, February 15, Serbia) 
 World MMA Champion under ISFA rules 2016, September 17 (revenge with Yuri Gorbenko)
 World Combat Wrestling Champion 2015 and 2016 under 100 kg
 World cup Combat Sambo 1st place 2014, Burgas 6 September
 World Sanda / Sanshou Champion 2009,  Sofia 22 November; and 2013, Kavarna 19 July 
 European Sanda / Sanshou Champion 2009, Sofia 31 May and 2011, Sofia 18 December
 European Combat Wrestling Champion under 100 kg, 2018, Romania
 Sanda / Sanshou national champion 7 times
 Balkan Sanda / Sanshou Champion 2007
 BJJ national champion 2009, 2010 and 2011
 Vice European Combat Sambo Champion 
 Vice European Hand Combat Champion 2012 over 90 kg
 Combat Sambo national champion 9 times
 No gi Grappling champion 5 times
 Judo champion
 Jiu-Jutsu fighting champion
 Savate national champion May 2022

Mixed martial arts record

|-
|Win
|align=center|26–10–1
|Ivan Vicic
|Submission (Guillotine Choke)
|BFC - Battle for Caribrod
|
|align=center|1
|align=center|1:27
|Caribrod, Serbia
|
|-
|Win
|align=center|25–10–1
|Yuri Gorbenko
|Submission (Toe Hold)
|ISFA 2 - Gorbenko vs. Georgiev
|
|align=center|3
|align=center|2:32
|Goce Delchev, Bulgaria
|Title Match for ISFA PRO MMA Light-Heavy Weight Belt
|
|
|
|-
|Win
|align=center|24–10–1
|Andrei Petre Nastac
|Submission (Guillotine Choke)
|Maxfight - Warriors 38
|
|align=center|1
|align=center|2:46
|Varna, Bulgaria
|
|-
|Win
|align=center|23–10–1
|Emil Plovdiv
|TKO (Punches)
|Twins MMA 
|
|align=center|1
|align=center|2:05
|Veliko Tarnovo, Bulgaria
|
|-
|Win
|align=center|22–10–1
|Aidan Aidan
|Decision (unanimous)
|Twins MMA 
|
|align=center|3
|align=center|5:00
|Gorna Oriahovica, Bulgaria
|
|-
|Loss
|align=center|21–10–1
|Tomislav Spahović
|Decision (unanimous)
|FFC07: Sarajevo
|
|align=center|3
|align=center|5:00
|Sarajevo, Bosnia and Herzegovina
|
|-
|Win
|align=center|21–9–1
|Lazar Todev
|Decision (unanimous)
|Twins MMA 8 - Dimitrov vs. Plasaris
|
|align=center|3
|align=center|5:00
|Sofia, Bulgaria
|
|-
|Win
|align=center|20–9–1
|Georgi Dimitrov
|Submission (rear naked choke)
|Twins MMA 7 - Dimitrov vs. Anagnostopoulos
|
|align=center|1
|align=center|4:55
|Sofia, Bulgaria
|
|-
|Win
|align=center|19–9–1
|Milan Simonovich 
|Submission (arm-triangle choke)
|Arena MMA Plovdiv - Fight Night 3
|
|align=center|2
|align=center|0:35
|Plovdiv, Bulgaria
|
|-
|Win
|align=center|18–9–1
|Hristo Yordanov 
|Submission (rear naked choke)
|Arena MMA Plovdiv - Fight Night 1
|
|align=center|3
|align=center|2:32
|Plovdiv, Bulgaria
|
|-
|Win
|align=center|17–9–1
|Milosh Doichinovich 
|Submission (rear naked choke)
|Twins MMA 4 - Nobrega vs. Mitkov
|
|align=center|2
|align=center|1:50
|Sofia, Bulgaria
|
|-
|Win
|align=center|16–9–1
|Zsolt Balla
|Decision (unanimous)
|RXF 7 - Romanian Xtreme Fighting 
|
|align=center|3
|align=center|5:00
|Pitești, Romania
|
|-
|Win
|align=center|15–9–1
|Marko Radulovic 
|KO (head kick)
|MMAUF - MMA Ultimate Fighting 1
|
|align=center|1
|align=center|1:00
|Dimitrovgrad, Serbia
|
|-
|Win
|align=center|14–9–1
|Veselin Parashkevov 
|Submission (rear naked choke)
|TWINS MMA-2
|
|align=center|1
|align=center|4:25
|Sofia, Bulgaria
|
|-
|Win
|align=center|13–9–1
|Daniel Iliev 
|Submission (rear naked choke)
|TWINS MMA-1 and Max Fight-31
|
|align=center|2
|align=center|2:45
|Sofia, Bulgaria
|
|-
|Win
|align=center|12–9–1
|Simeon Kichukov
|TKO (punches)
|BMMAF - Max Fight 29
|
|align=center|2
|align=center|3:41
|Sveti Vlas, Bulgaria
| 
|-
|Loss
|align=center|11–9–1
|Emil Samuilov Zahariev
|TKO (punches)
|BMMAF - Max Fight 28
|
|align=center|2
|align=center|4:28
|Sofia, Bulgaria
|
|-
|Loss
|align=center|11–8–1
|Yuri Gorbenko 
|KO (punch)
|FDI Real Kech - Battle of Sofia 
|
|align=center|3
|align=center|N/A
|Sofia, Bulgaria
|
|-
|Win
|align=center|11–7–1
|Alexander Kozienko 
|TKO (punches)
|FDI Real Kech - Battle of Sofia
|
|align=center|1
|align=center|N/A
|Sofia, Bulgaria
|
|-
|Win
|align=center|10–7–1
|Piotr Adamczuk
|Submission (armbar)
|EMMA - Explosive 1
|
|align=center|1
|align=center|3:02
|Bradford, England
|
|-
|Win
|align=center|9–7–1
|Autimio Antonia
|KO (head kick)
|Victory Combat Sports 1
|
|align=center|1
|align=center|2:02
|Vienna, Austria
|
|-
|Loss
|align=center|8–7–1
|Baga Agaev
|Submission (armbar)
|RPC 10 - Rising Force
|
|align=center|1
|align=center|3:10
|Sofia, Bulgaria
|
|-
|Win
|align=center|8–6–1
|Julian Chilikov
|TKO (punches)
|RPC 9 - Collision
|
|align=center|2
|align=center|2:11
|Sofia, Bulgaria
|
|-
|Win
|align=center|7–6–1
|Cătălin Zmărăndescu
|Decision (unanimous)
|Local Kombat "Bătălia Balcanilor"
|
|align=center|2
|align=center|5:00
|Constanța, Romania
| 
|-
|Win
|align=center|6–6–1
|Stanoy Tabakov
|KO (punches)
|RPC: Domination
|
|align=center|1
|align=center|4:00
|Sofia, Bulgaria
| 
|-
|Loss
|align=center|5–5-1
|Emil Samuilov Zahariev
|Submission (heel hook)
|2009 BMMAF - Warriors 12
|
|align=center|1
|align=center|3:59
|Ruse, Bulgaria
|
|-
|Win
|align=center|5–4–1
|Aleksander Radosavljevic
|Decision (unanimous)
|WFC 7
|
|align=center|3
|align=center|5:00
|Sofia, Bulgaria
|
|-
| Draw
|align=center|4–4–1
|Emil Samuilov Zahariev
|Draw
|BMMAF: Warriors 6
|
|align=center|2
|align=center|5:00
|Stara Zagora, Bulgaria
|
|-
|Win
|align=center|4–4
|Stanimir Petrov
|Submission (rear naked choke)
|BMMAF: Warriors 5
|
|align=center|1
|align=center|4:12
|Plovdiv, Bulgaria
|
|-
|Loss
|align=center|3–4
|Georgi Todorchev
|Decision (split)
|BMMAF: Warriors 4
|
|align=center|2
|align=center|5:00
|Sveti Vlas, Bulgaria
|
|-
|Loss
|align=center|3–3
|Roman Savochka
|Submission (achilles lock)
|WAFC: World Pankration Championship 2008
|
|align=center|1
|align=center|0:50
|Khabarovsk, Khabarovsk Krai, Russia
|
|-
|Win
|align=center|3–2
|Bashir Yamilkhanov
|KO (soccer kick)
|WAFC: World Pankration Championship 2008
|
|align=center|1
|align=center|4:50
|Khabarovsk, Khabarovsk Krai, Russia
|
|-
|Loss
|align=center|2–2
|Blagoi Ivanov
| TKO (corner stoppage)
|FM - Fitness Mania
|
|align=center|1
|align=center|5:00
|Pazardzhik, Bulgaria
|
|-
|Win
|align=center|2–1
|Emil Zahariev 
|Decision
|Shooto - Bulgaria
|
|align=center|2
|align=center|5:00
|Bulgaria
|
|-
|Win
|align=center|1–1
|Yvor Marinchev
|Submission (rear naked choke)
|Day of the champions-2
|
|align=center|1
|align=center|4:02
|Haskovo, Bulgaria
|
|-
|Loss
|align=center|0–1
|S. N.
|TKO (punches illigal elbow)
|Shooto-2, Bulgaria
|
|align=center|1
|align=center|2:11
|Pazardzhik, Bulgaria
|
|-

References

|
|
|
|
|
|
|
|
|-

External links

Year of birth missing (living people)
Living people
Bulgarian male mixed martial artists
Light heavyweight mixed martial artists
Bulgarian sanshou practitioners
Bulgarian sambo practitioners
Bulgarian male judoka
Mixed martial artists utilizing sanshou
Mixed martial artists utilizing judo
Mixed martial artists utilizing sambo
Sportspeople from Sofia
SUPERKOMBAT kickboxers